The 1962 Campeonato Ecuatoriano de Fútbol was the 4th national championship for football teams in Ecuador. 

Guayaquilean club Everest won their first national title, and earned a berth in the 1963 Copa de Campeones. To date, this is Everest's only national title.

Qualified teams

Standings

Results

Championship playoff

References

Ecuadorian Serie A seasons
1962 in Ecuadorian sport
Ecu